Stanley Tarshis (born November 15, 1937) was the NCAA horizontal bar champion in 1959 and 1960. In 1958, he came in second place to Abie Grossfeld preventing him from becoming the only three-time horizontal bar champion in NCAA history. Tarshis was also awarded the “Big Ten Medal of Honor” in 1960 in his final year at Michigan State University.

References

1937 births
Living people
American male artistic gymnasts
Michigan State Spartans men's gymnasts